Black Moses is the fifth studio album by American soul musician Isaac Hayes. It is a double album released on Stax Records' Enterprise label in 1971. The follow-up to Hayes' successful soundtrack for Shaft (also a double album), Black Moses features Hayes' version of The Jackson 5's hit single "Never Can Say Goodbye". Hayes' version became a hit in its own right, peaking at number 22 on the Billboard Hot 100. The album reached number one on the Billboard R&B album chart on January 15, 1972.

Background
In addition to "Never Can Say Goodbye", other selections on Black Moses include covers of songs made popular by The Carpenters ("(They Long to Be) Close to You", Toussaint McCall ("Nothing Takes the Place of You"), The Friends of Distinction ("Going in Circles"), Dionne Warwick ("I'll Never Fall in Love Again"), and Little Johnny Taylor ("Part Time Love"). Hayes names Black Moses as one of his most personal works.

The very same sample of "Ike's Rap II" was used in four tracks at about the same time in the mid-1990s: "Hell Is Round the Corner" by Tricky, "Glory Box" by Portishead, "Jorge da Capadócia" and "Salve" both by Brazilian rap group Racionais MC's.  It was also sampled by Alessia Cara in her song "Here" recorded in 2014.

The album's title derives from Stax executive Dino Woodward's nickname for Hayes, which he bestowed upon the musician after comparing the effects of his music on black audiences to the leadership of the biblical figure Moses. The then deeply Christian Hayes shied away from the nickname, finding it "sacrilegious", although journalist Chester Higgins popularized the "Black Moses" nickname in an article he wrote on Hayes for Jet. Hayes came to see "Black Moses" as a symbol of black pride:
Black men could finally stand up and be men because here's Black Moses; he's the epitome of black masculinity. Chains that once represented bondage and slavery now can be a sign of power and strength and sexuality and virility

Larry Shaw, head of marketing and publicity at Stax, came up with the idea to name Hayes' LP Black Moses. He also devised, with the assistance of Bar-Kays member Ron Gordon, a gatefold album cover design which unfolded into a poster-sized image of Hayes, dressed in biblical-inspired attire as "Black Moses".

Track listing

Note: Some of the vinyl pressings (and all CD releases) have a non-standard arrangement of the sides: sides 1 and 4 are pressed on one disc along with sides 2 and 3 on the other. This practice, known as "automatic sequence", was intentional on vinyl.

Personnel
Isaac Hayes - lead and background vocals
 "Hot", "Buttered", and "Soul": backing vocals
 The Bar-Kays, instrumentation: "(They Long to Be) Close to You" and "Going in Circles"
 Instrumentation on all other tracks by The Isaac Hayes Movement:
 Piano, vibraphone, organ, electric piano - Isaac Hayes
 Bass - Ronnie Hudson
 Bongos, congas - Gary Jones
 Drums, tambourine - Willie Hall
 Electric piano - Lester Snell
 Guitar - Charles "Skip" Pitts
 Piano - Sidney Kirk
Arranged by Isaac Hayes & Johnny Allen, except "(They Long To Be) Close to You" by Isaac Hayes & Dale Warren
Engineers: Ron Capone, William Brown, Henry Bush, Eddie Marion, Dave Purple
Remix engineers: Ron Capone, Dave Purple and Isaac Hayes

Covers and samples
 Portishead uses a sample from "Ike's Rap II" in the song "Glory Box". That same year (1995), artist Tricky used the same sample for his song "Hell Is Round The Corner".
Brazilian rap group Racionais MC's sampled "Ike's Rap II" on the first track "Jorge da Capadócia" from their 1997 album Sobrevivendo no Inferno.
 Canadian singer Alessia Cara samples "Ike's Rap II" on her debut single "Here".
 The sample was also used in Snoh Aalegra's song "Nothing Burns Like The Cold".
 Isaac Hayes covered the song "Good Love" as his Chef character for the 1999 film South Park: Bigger, Longer and Uncut.
 American rapper Cormega samples "Medley: "Ike's Rap III" / "Your Love is So Doggone Good" in the song "Love in Love Out" on his second album The True Meaning.

See also
List of number-one R&B albums of 1972 (U.S.)

References

Notes
Bowman, Rob (1997). Soulsville U.S.A.: The Story of Stax Records. New York: Schirmer Trade. 

Isaac Hayes albums
1971 albums
Stax Records albums
Albums produced by Isaac Hayes
Albums with cover art by Joel Brodsky